The Schwarza is a river in Lower Austria. It is the left headstream of the Leitha.

Course 
The Schwarza rises near the mountain Tettenhengst, part of the Gutenstein Alps, flows through the Höllental gorge and the Schwarza valley. Near Haderswörth in the parish of Lanzenkirchen the Schwarza combines with the Pitten and is then called the Leitha. The Schwarza is part of the Natura 2000 region known as "North Eastern Border Alps: Hohe Wand – Schneeberg – Rax" (Nordöstliche Randalpen: Hohe Wand - Schneeberg - Rax).

Character 
The Schwarza is characterized in its upper reaches by undercuts, high cliffs, gravel banks, pools and deep gullies. The lower reaches are strictly regulated as far as Schwarzau am Steinfeld. Only between Schwarzau am Steinfeld and Bad Erlach can the Schwarza spread out into wide meanders again.

The river bed below the so-called "Dunkelstein Weir" in the municipality of Ternitz usually only carries water at times of snowmelt and during heavy rain. The water flows through several works channels through the town of Neunkirchen. Here it powers some small hydro plants.

At the Peisching Weir most of the water from the River Schwarza (maximum ) is fed into the  canal, which, in turn, feeds the Wiener Neustadt Canal.

During heavy rainfall, snowmelt and storms, the Schwarza quickly swells into a raging torrent.

Economic and transportation importance 
Initially, the river was economically important for the timber industry. From 1803 wood from the forests on both sides of Schwarza was floated down the Schwarza and the Kehrbach to Wiener Neustadt and then loaded onto barges and transported to Vienna on the Wiener Neustadt Canal.

In earlier times, it was turned into charcoal in large kilns near the Wind Bridge. From the beginning to the middle of the 19th century numerous factories, especially paper mills, were established in the region.

The Schwarza is also used to generate electricity. For this purpose several works channels were built along the Schwarza, through which through most of the waters of the Schwarza now flow.

Of the once important paper mills, today only the company of Mayr-Melnhof Karton (MM Karton) in Hirschwang is still in operation. Numerous factory closures affected the working and social life of the region. For example, after the closure of the paper mill in Schlöglmühl, a television documentary was produced called  ("Postal Address 2640 Schlöglmühl") which portrayed the decline of the former paper industry.

The Höllental Road (B 27) follows the Schwarza valley for the entire length of the river.

Water from the catchment area of the Schwarza has been used to supply drinking water to Vienna, since the 1st Viennese Spring Water Supply Network (1. Wiener Hochquellenwasserleitung) was built in 1869–1873.

Natural region 
Typical animal species for the Schwarza are the: otter, grey wagtail, grey heron, wallcreeper, white-throated dipper, grayling, brown trout and bullhead.

In the vicinity of the Schwarza near  (belongs to Reichenau an der Rax), it was switched from the conventional restocking of fish to supporting a natural supply of fishing stock. In particular, the stock of domestic brown trout is supported by "cocooning" and "artificial nests". The goal of this project is to build a native fish stock, capable of sustaining itself. In particular, the use of "artificial nests" (spawning beds are directly injected into the substrate) supports the natural supply of brown trout.

References

External links 
 
 The Schwarza at www.wwf.at 
 The Schwarza at www.angeltreff.org 
 Data on the Schwarza near Gloggnitz 

Rivers of Lower Austria
Rivers of Austria